The 2018 Première ligue de soccer du Québec féminine season was the first season of play for the Première ligue de soccer du Québec, a Division 3 women's soccer league in the Canadian soccer pyramid and the highest level of soccer based in the Canadian province of Québec.

Teams 
The following five teams took part in the inaugural season in 2018:

Standings

Top scorers

Awards

References 

2018 in Canadian soccer
2018